"Innuendo" is a song by the British rock band Queen. Written by Freddie Mercury and Roger Taylor but credited to Queen, it is the opening track on the album of the same name (1991), and was released as the first single from the album. The single debuted at number one on the UK Singles Chart in January 1991, the band's first number-one hit since "Under Pressure" in 1981, and additionally reached the top ten in ten other countries. It is included on the band's second compilation album Greatest Hits II. It was the band's first single release of the 1990s.

At six-and-a-half minutes, it is one of Queen's epic songs. The song has been described as "reminiscent" of "Bohemian Rhapsody" because it was "harking back to their progressive rock roots". Its verses are in the Phrygian Dominant and features a flamenco guitar section performed by Yes guitarist Steve Howe and Brian May, also in that mode, an operatic interlude and sections of hard rock that recall early Queen, in addition to the lyric inspired in part by Mercury's illness; although media stories about his health were being denied strenuously, he was by now seriously ill with AIDS, from which he would die in November 1991, 10 months after the song was released.

The song was accompanied by a music video featuring animated representations of the band on a cinema screen akin to Nineteen Eighty-Four, eerie plasticine figure stop-motion and harrowing imagery. It has been described as one of the band's darkest and most moving works. AllMusic described the song as a "superb epic" which deals with "mankind's inability to live harmoniously".

Songwriting
"Innuendo" was pieced together "like a jigsaw puzzle". The recurring theme (with the Boléro-esque beat) started off as a jam session between May, Deacon and Taylor. Mercury then added the melody and some of the lyric, which were then completed by Taylor.

The middle section was primarily Mercury's work, according to an interview with May in October 1994's Guitar Magazine. It features a flamenco guitar solo, followed by a classically influenced bridge, and then the solo again but performed with electric guitars. This section is especially complex, featuring a pattern of three bars in 5/4 time (reasonably uncommon in popular music) followed by five bars in the more often used 3/4 time. The end of the flamenco-guitar style is based on the 5/4 bar, but is in 6/4 time.

The bridge section ("You can be anything you want to be") features sophisticated orchestration, created by Mercury and producer David Richards using the popular Korg M1 keyboard/synth/workstation. Mercury had arranged and co-arranged orchestras in his solo career, and closed the previous Queen album with the track "Was It All Worth It", which included a Gershwin-esque interlude also coming from an M1 synth. The Bridge section in "Innuendo" is in 3/4, showing once again Mercury's affection for triple metres: "Bicycle Race" is another one with main sections in 4/4 and middle-eight in 3/4, and some of his best-known pieces (namely "We Are the Champions" and "Somebody to Love") were in 6/8, as would be his last composition, "A Winter's Tale".

Steve Howe's involvement
Steve Howe has said he was "so proud" to have played on the song and he became the only Queen non-member to have played guitar on a studio recording of a Queen song. Howe and Mercury had been friends for several years, since they ran into each other quite often at the Townhouse Studios in London. Yes had recorded Going for the One at Mountain Studios in 1976–77 shortly before Queen bought the Swiss studio, and Asia's debut album was produced by Queen's engineer, Mike Stone.

On a break from a recording session in Geneva, Howe drove to Montreux and stopped to have lunch. There he ran into Martin Groves, who had worked for Yes before and by this time was Queen's equipment supervisor. Groves told him Queen were in the studio at the moment.

As soon as Steve Howe went into the studios, Mercury asked him to play some guitar (according to producer David Richards, who had worked with Yes in the past as well). Another version is that Brian May was the one who asked him to play the flamenco bit. When the members of Queen asked if Howe wanted to play on the title track, Howe politely suggested they’d lost their minds. It took the combined weight of Mercury, May and Taylor to persuade him.

According to Steve Howe:

The album's liner notes contain the credit "on "Innuendo": Additional Wandering Minstrel Spanish Guitar - Somewhere In The Middle - by Steve Howe. Many thanks Steve".

Music video

A very elaborate music video was created to accompany the single and released on 20 December 1990, combining stop motion animation with rotoscoping and featuring dolls in a detailed miniature cinema set. The band members only appear as illustrations and images, mainly taken from earlier Queen music videos (such as "The Miracle", "Scandal", "Breakthru", "The Invisible Man", "I Want It All", and clips from the then unreleased "Live at Wembley '1986"), on a cinema screen in the same manner as in the film Nineteen Eighty-Four, with Mercury drawn in the style of Leonardo da Vinci, May in the style of Victorian etchings, Taylor in the style of Jackson Pollock, and Deacon in the style of Pablo Picasso. It also featured a montage of historical stock footages, including from both WWII and the Gulf War. The interlude of Flamenco music showed claymation figures of jesters performing, which were animated by Klaybow Films. The video received heavy rotation on MTV Europe and won production company DoRo (who also produced the videos to all other singles from the Innuendo album) a Monitor Award for Best Achievement in Music Video.

Critical reception
Ian Gittins, writing for Melody Maker, considered the song to be "Bohemian Rhapsody" Vol II and described it as "seductively monstrous". He added, "All ill-starred vocal operatics, hairy-palmed guitar runs and portentous drivel, it even breaks into Spanish rhumba at one sublime point." David Quantick of NME described it as a "spectacularly tossy rock anthem".

Track listings
 7-inch single
A. "Innuendo" (album version) – 6:30
B. "Bijou" – 3:37

 12-inch and CD single
 "Innuendo" (explosive version) – 6:46
 "Under Pressure" – 4:04
 "Bijou" - 3:37

Personnel

Queen
 Freddie Mercury – lead and backing vocals, keyboards
 Brian May – electric guitar, classical guitar
 Roger Taylor – drums, percussion
 John Deacon – bass guitar
Additional musicians
 Steve Howe – classical guitars and Spanish guitar solos
 David Richards – keyboard programming

Charts

Weekly charts

Year-end charts

Certifications

Other versions
The song and parts of the Led Zeppelin songs "Kashmir" and "Thank You" were performed by that band's lead singer Robert Plant with the three surviving members of Queen (May, Taylor and Deacon) at The Freddie Mercury Tribute Concert in 1992 at Wembley Stadium. "Kashmir" had been one of the inspirations for "Innuendo". However, the song was left off the DVD release at Plant's request, as he forgot part of the lyrics and his vocal was, by his own admission, not in the best shape. As in "Kashmir", the title of the song appears in the lyrics only once.

The 12-inch "explosive version" of "Innuendo" features a noise similar to an atomic bomb after Mercury sings the line "until the end of time".

There was a "promo version" released of the song, accompanied by an edited video. This version clocks in at only 3 minutes and 28 seconds.

Chris Daughtry covered this song on the Queen themed week on American Idol'''s fifth season.

Hard rock band Queensrÿche has covered this song in their Take Cover album.

Power metal band Lords of Black recorded a cover of the song  in their second studio album II (2016). It appears as a bonus for the digital edition.

In popular culture
 The song is included in the competitive karaoke videogame SingStar Queen for PlayStation 2 and PlayStation 3.
 The song is used as an introduction videomix for We Will Rock You.
 The song was used during an episode of The Death of Yugoslavia''.

References

External links
 Lyrics at Queen official website

Queen (band) songs
1991 singles
1991 songs
Animated music videos
British progressive rock songs
Hollywood Records singles
Number-one singles in Portugal
Parlophone singles
Songs written by Freddie Mercury
Songs written by Roger Taylor (Queen drummer)
UK Singles Chart number-one singles